The gens Lavinia was a minor family at ancient Rome.

Origin
The nomen Lavinius could come from the ancient town of Lavinium, which was said to have been founded by Aeneas, and named for his wife, Lavinia, the daughter of Latinus.  It could also be an alternate form of Laevinius.  However, the first recorded member was a colonial magistrate at Luceria at the end of the Pyrrhic War, so the gens possibly originated from this city.

Members
 Marcus Lavinius, duumvir of Luceria circa 275 BC; he minted bronze coins during his magistracy.
Publius Lavinius, a Latin grammarian, and the author of De Verbis Sordidis ("On Vulgar Words"), a treatise mentioned by Aulus Gellius.  He could possibly be the same person as the Laevinus mentioned by Macrobius.
 Quintus Lavinius Marcellus, provided a memorial tablet for his grandmother, Julia Philumene, found near St. Peter's Basilica.
 Aulus Curtius Lavinius Suavis, named on a sepulchral inscription near the Praenestine Gate.
 Titus Lavinius, commemorated on an inscription in the street between the Colosseum and San Giovanni, probably should be read as Flavinus.

See also
 List of Roman gentes

References

Bibliography
 Aulus Gellius, Noctes Atticae (Attic Nights).
 Ambrosius Theodosius Macrobius, Saturnalia.
 Dictionary of Greek and Roman Biography and Mythology, William Smith, ed., Little, Brown and Company, Boston (1849).
 Theodor Mommsen et alii, Corpus Inscriptionum Latinarum (The Body of Latin Inscriptions, abbreviated "CIL"), Berlin-Brandenburgische Akademie der Wissenschaften (1853–present).
Oliver D. Hoover, Handbook of Coins of Italy and Magna Graecia, Sixth to First Centuries BC [The Handbook of Greek Coinage Series, Volume 1], Lancaster/London, Classical Numismatic Group, 2018.

Roman gentes